Jászapáti is a town in Jász-Nagykun-Szolnok county, in the Northern Great Plain region of central Hungary.

Geography

Politics 
The current mayor of Jászapáti is Ferenc Farkas (Fidesz-KDNP).

The local Municipal Assembly, elected at the 2019 local government elections, is made up of 9 members (1 Mayor and 8 Individual list MEPs) divided into this political parties and alliances:

Twin towns – sister cities

Jászapáti is twinned with:
 Glodeni, Romania (2014)

 Kamenín, Slovakia (2010)
 Temerin, Serbia (2011)

Notable residents
János Pócs (1963-), politician
József Tajti (1943-), footballer and coach
Elemér Gombos (1915-unknown), Olympic swimmer
Pál Vágó (1853-1928), painter

Gallery

References

External links

  in Hungarian

Populated places in Jász-Nagykun-Szolnok County
Jászság